Ngalula is a Congolese surname. Notable people with the surname include:

Joseph Ngalula (born 1928), Congolese writer and politician
Lukengu Ngalula (born 1971), Congolese basketball player
Tina Ngalula, Congolese footballer

Surnames of African origin